Nannastacidae is a family of crustaceans belonging to the order Cumacea. They have no free telson. The endopods (interior branches) of the uropods are present on one segment. There are exopods (outer branches) on the maxillipeds and generally one on pereopods 1–4 in males and 1–2 in females. In the females the second antenna is much shorter than the first. It contains the following genera:

Almyracuma Jones & Burbanck, 1959
Bacescella Petrescu, 2000
Bathycampylaspis Muhlenhardt-Siegel, 1996
Campylaspenis Bacescu & Muradian 1974
Campylaspides Fage, 1929
Campylaspis G. O. Sars, 1865
Claudicuma Roccatagliata, 1981
Cubanocuma Bacescu & Muradian, 1977
Cumella G. O. Sars, 1865
Cumellopsis Calman, 1905
Elassocumella Watling, 1991
Humesiana Watling & Gerken, 2001
Nannastacus Bate, 1865
Normjonesia Petrescu & Heard, 2001 
Paracampylaspis Jones, 1984
Pavlovskeola Lomakina, 1955
Platycuma Calman, 1905
Procampylaspis Bonnier, 1896
Scherocumella Watling, 1991 
Schizocuma Bacescu, 1972
Schizotrema Calman, 1911
Styloptocuma Bacescu & Muradian, 1974
Styloptocumoides Petrescu, 2006
Vemacumella Petrescu, 2001

References

External links

Cumacea
Crustacean families